The Divider: Trump in the White House, 2017-2021 is a 2022 book by American journalists Peter Baker and Susan Glasser. It details the presidency of Donald Trump, with a focus on the divisions that occurred both among the White House staff and with international partners.

References

2022 non-fiction books
Books about the Trump administration
Doubleday (publisher) books